Shih-Ying Lee or S. Y. Lee (April 30, 1918 – July 2, 2018) was an American aerodynamicist, businessman, inventor, and mechanical engineer who was noted for his research and innovation in hydrodynamics-related technologies. He was also a Professor Emeritus at the Massachusetts Institute of Technology.

Biography 

Lee was born in 1918 in Beijing, Republic of China. Lee attended Tsinghua University in 1936, obtained his bachelor's degree in civil engineering in 1940. Lee worked as a teaching assistant at Tsinghua for nearly two years and went to study in the United States in 1942. Lee obtained his PhD at the Massachusetts Institute of Technology in 1945.

After graduation, Lee soon taught engineering at MIT; and was promoted from teaching assistant to full professor and finally Professor Emeritus after his retirement in 1974.

In 1985, Lee was elected Member of the United States National Academy of Engineering for his original research on control valve stability, for innovative dynamic measurement instrumentation, and for successful entrepreneurial commercialization of his inventions. Lee has been granted many US patents.

Lee founded or co-founded several companies specialized in process control and hydrodynamic instruments. Lee co-founded Dynisco Inc. and Setra Systems Inc. with his brother Y. T. Li and was Chairman of the company. He donated funds to establish the Shih-Ying Lee Scholarship at Tsinghua. He died in July 2018 at the age of 100.

References 
 An Autobiography — China to MIT to Setra Systems (2007; Lee's autobiography)
 Home at Tsinghua (《家在清华》; by S.Y. Lee; April, 2008)

1918 births
2018 deaths
20th-century American businesspeople
20th-century American engineers
20th-century American physicists
Aerodynamicists
American aerospace businesspeople
American aerospace designers
American aerospace engineers
American centenarians
American civil engineers
American inventors
American manufacturing businesspeople
American mechanical engineers
Businesspeople from Beijing
Chinese emigrants to the United States
Engineers from Beijing
Members of the United States National Academy of Engineering
Men centenarians
MIT School of Engineering alumni
MIT School of Engineering faculty
Physicists from Beijing
Tsien family
Tsinghua University alumni